Maoricrambus is a genus of moths of the family Crambidae. It contains only one species, Maoricrambus oncobolus, which is endemic to New Zealand. This species is classified as Nationally Endangered by the Department of Conservation.

Taxonomy
M. oncobolus was named by Edward Meyrick in 1885 and described using a specimen collected at Castle Hill Basin, now part of the Kura Tāwhiti Conservation Area near Arthur's Pass. In 1895 when listing the species George Hampson misspelt it resulting in the synonym for the species of Crambus oncolobus. In 1975 D. E. Gaskin erected the monotypic genus Maoricrambus for Crambus oncolobus. The lectotype and paralectotype specimens are held at the Natural History Museum, London.

Description 
Meyrick described the species as follows:

M. oncobolus is very similar in appearance to Orocrambus harpophorus. However M. oncobolus does not have the subterminal spotting of the forewings that can be found on the forewings of O. harpophorus. Also the two species are dissimilar in both the male and female genital structure.

Adults are on wing from December to February.

Distribution
M. oncobolus is endemic to New Zealand. This species is restricted to central Canterbury and Southland. Specimens of this species have been collected at Porter River among the boulders and lichens near the edge of the river and at the Sandy Point Domain near Invercargill.

Habitat 
M. oncobolus is associated with riverside grasslands in Southland and braided riverbeds central Canterbury.

Host plants 
The host plants of this species are unknown.

Conservation status
M. oncobolus is regarded as being "Nationally Endangered" under the New Zealand Threat Classification System.

References

Crambinae
Monotypic moth genera
Moths of New Zealand
Endemic fauna of New Zealand
Crambidae genera
Endangered biota of New Zealand
Endemic moths of New Zealand